The archaeology of Saudi Arabia includes the following archaeological sites:
Abu Loza's Bath
Ain Qannas
Al Naslaa
Al-'Ula
Al-Rabadha
Al-Ukhaydir, Tabuk Province
Ancient towns in Saudi Arabia
Aynuna
Bir Hima Rock Petroglyphs and Inscriptions
Columns of Rajajil
Desert kite
Dhat al-Hajj
Dosariyah
Dumat al-Jandal
Dumat al-Jandal Wall
Gerrha
Hegra (Mada'in Salih)
Jabal al-Baidain
Jabal al-ʿHayn
Jubail Church
Land of Tema
Leuke Kome
Marid Castle
Near Eastern bioarchaeology
Old Town, Al-'Ula
Qal'at al-Qatif
Shanqal Fort
Sisira Well
Tarout Castle
Tarout Island
Tayma
Tomb of Eve
Uqair salt mine (Archaeological site)

Pharaonic Tayma inscription
Tayma stones

Rock art in Saudi Arabia
Al Naslaa
 Bir Hima Rock Petroglyphs and Inscriptions
Hasaitic dialect

Archaeology of Saudi Arabia
Rock art in Saudi Arabia